The 1957 Denver Pioneers football team was an American football team that represented the University of Denver as a member of the Skyline Conference during the 1957 NCAA University Division football season. In their third season under head coach John Roning, the Pioneers compiled a 6–4 record (5–2 against conference opponents), finished third in the Skyline, and were outscored by a total of 155 to 150.

Schedule

References

Denver
Denver Pioneers football seasons
Denver Pioneers football